GIANTmicrobes is a toy company based in Stamford, Connecticut, founded by Drew Oliver. GIANTmicrobes manufactures designer plush stuffed toys and accessories resembling microbes, vaccines, organs, and other microscopic things like cells, antibodies, and chemicals.

Appearance 

The appearance of each 5-7 inch long toy is based on electron micrographs of the real microbe (not necessarily correctly coloured), thus the toys represent an approximate million-fold magnification of the actual organisms in many cases, and can serve as educational toys or mascots for situations such as university open days.

Reception 

The Telegraph, under a photograph of a pale purple "Kissing Disease plush toy (the Epstein-Barr virus)", described Giant Microbes as a "bizarre" range of soft toys that are popular among students, care workers and children.

Chris Hinton, writing on Wired, describes the range of toys, including Shigella and Rhinovirus, the microbes responsible for stomach aches and common colds. He suggests that the toys will awaken children's interest in the microscopic world, while they also enjoy them as cuddly toys.

Anna Kuchment in Newsweek magazine writes that toy designer Drew Oliver thought of making giant microbes on reading Richard Feynman's Surely You're Joking, Mr Feynman! which described seeing a microbe in a drop of water. Kuchment describes the product as a combination of "gag gift and educational toy", commenting that it is awkward to market, but admiring Oliver's infectious enthusiasm.

References

Additional sources

External links

 
 Telegraph: Giant Epstein-Barr virus
 Review by Michael Crawford
 CNET News: photo
 Article Directory: 7 Best Selling Giant Microbes (Review)
 TrendHunter: Disease-Themed Plushies
 PRNewswire: Sperm & Egg Sets

Toy companies of the United States
Companies based in Stamford, Connecticut
Stuffed toys
Educational toys